"Back Together" is a song by American singer Robin Thicke. It premiered on August 5, 2015. It was made available for digital download and released a single on August 6, 2015, by Interscope Records. The song, produced by Max Martin and  Ali Payami, features a guest appearance from American rapper Nicki Minaj.

Background and composition
Thicke and Minaj first collaborated on the track "Shakin' It 4 Daddy" for Thicke's fourth studio album Sex Therapy: The Session (2009). Speaking on Minaj's involvement during an interview for On Air with Ryan Seacrest, Thicke said, "I was working with Max Martin and [Savan Kotecha] and we had been messing with the song for a few months, and then Max finally got it to a place where he loved it and I thought it could use a little spice — a little edge. That’s when I sent it to Nicki and she loved it." "Back Together" is raging, disco-fied track.

During an interview with Good Morning America, when asked about the meaning of the song or if there were any intended allusions to his ex-wife (Paula Patton) Thicke explained, "Actually I didn't write the song so I can't take credit for the meaning, but when I met with the producers ... I just heard this idea of getting back together and getting yourself back together and, you know, what I was going through at the time I really related to that and connected with it so it's more about the theme of getting yourself back together with love and partnership".

Radio version and music video

The radio version of the song is censored, replacing the word "fuck" with a sample of Thicke exclaiming "Ow!" in a falsetto. This version is also used in the music video.

The music video features Thicke in a tuxedo at a poolside resort with an attractive woman to whom he addresses the song. She pushes him into the pool, seeming to indicate she's upset with him. Later they are together again, seemingly on another day, getting along. Thicke then walks through the hotel and sees Minaj in her room, where she performs her part of the track. Minaj seems to seduce him, only to walk away when he acquiesces to her advances. Having now lost both women, Thicke leaves the hotel but stops to join a band performing outside.

Critical reception
The song was described by Los Angeles Times music writer Mikael Wood as "a total banger, with a killer electro-disco groove ... and a delightfully raunchy guest verse by Nicki Minaj." Jon Blistein of Rolling Stone wrote, "'Back Together' boasts a bumping Studio 54 disco beat and buzzsaw synths reminiscent of the electro-pop surge led by Justice and Daft Punk. Thicke, however, sounds as soulful as ever, breezily crooning devoted paeans to a destructive love over Martin's catchy production."

Music video
A music video for the song, directed by Ben Mor, was filmed in Miami. It was premiered via Thicke's VEVO channel on August 13, 2015.

Live performances
Thicke has performed the song on Good Morning America, The Late Late Show with James Corden, Jimmy Kimmel Live!, and The Tonight Show with Jimmy Fallon.

On May 21, 2017, Thicke performed this song at 4th Indonesian Choice Awards.

Charts

Certifications and sales

References

External links

2015 songs
2015 singles
Disco songs
Robin Thicke songs
Nicki Minaj songs
Interscope Records singles
Song recordings produced by Max Martin
Songs written by Max Martin
Songs written by Ali Payami
Songs written by Savan Kotecha
Songs written by Nicki Minaj
Songs written by Robin Thicke